Alex Wayman (January 11, 1921 – September 22, 2004) was a Tibetologist and Indologist and worked as a professor of Sanskrit at Columbia University. He was of Jewish background.

After finishing his B.A. (1948), M.A. (1949) and Ph. D. (1959) at the University of California, Los Angeles he came to Columbia as a visiting professor in 1966. In 1967 he was made professor of Sanskrit and remained in this position until his retirement in 1991.

Wayman wrote many books on Buddhism, especially Tantric Buddhist themes, and on Buddhist logic.

References

 Columbia News: Alex Wayman, Pioneer of Tibetology, Dies at 83, 3. November 2004.
 

20th-century American Jews
American Indologists
Tibetologists
1921 births
2004 deaths
21st-century American Jews
University of California, Los Angeles alumni